Powell Alexander Janulus (born 1939) is a Canadian polyglot who lives in White Rock, British Columbia, and entered the Guinness World Records in 1985 for fluency in 42 languages. To qualify, he had to pass a two-hour conversational fluency test with a native speaker of each of the 42 languages he spoke at that time.

Early life

Powell Janulus was born in Vancouver, British Columbia, Canada. He was exposed to many Slavic languages as a child. His Polish mother spoke six languages while his Lithuanian father spoke at least four. He could speak 13 languages fluently at the age of 18. He attended Asian Studies at the University of British Columbia where he attempted to learn Mandarin. In an interview, he stated that he struggled with the academic teaching style. He became curious about the process of language learning and in the way that children learn languages so easily. He attempted to learn Chinese by having conversations and talking with as many Mandarin speakers as possible.

When Janulus was in his early 20s, he began to develop his methodology for fast language acquisition. In his 30s, he became a court translator and was paid for each language he could translate. He worked to learn two or three languages per year, as each language allowed him to earn more. He was authorized by the Provincial Court of British Columbia, as a court translator in 28 languages. He later became interested in language variations and could quickly learn related languages such as Spanish and Portuguese. In his 40s, he learned less common languages such as Tibetan, Romani, Inuit and Swahili. Later in life, he opened the Geneva Language Institute, a language school in Vancouver.

World record holder for fluency
In 1985, Janulus entered into the Guinness World Records for spoken fluency in 42 languages. To qualify, he took a two-hour conversational fluency test with a native speaker of each language he spoke at that time. This testing took place over one month. Powell said that he considers himself skilled in 64 languages and that he had studied at least 80. He said that the Canadian actor John Candy hired him to help him speak Punjabi for the 1989 film Who's Harry Crumb?. He appeared on The Tonight Show where talk show host Johnny Carson invited speakers of 48 languages to test Janulus.

It was reported that Powell speaks the following 42 languages: French, Spanish, Portuguese, Italian, Romanian, German, Dutch, Frisian, Norwegian, Danish, Swedish, Icelandic, Russian, Ukrainian, Polish, Czech, Serbian, Slovak, Slovene, Kashubian, Lusatian, Wendish, Belarusian, Macedonian, Bulgarian, Hindi, Punjabi, Urdu, Armenian, Sinhalese, Tibetan, Japanese, Mandarin, Cantonese, Croatian, Greek, Turkish, Kurdish, Finnish, Korean and Persian. This list does not include English, which is his native language, or the many other languages in which he has some proficiency.

Recent years

Powell was reported to have died in 2006, however this was inaccurate. In an interview, he stated that his disappearance was due to a stroke he suffered at that time. He reported that he lost his ability to speak English, due to brain damage. He claimed to have regained his English spoken ability by speaking Dutch with a nurse. He is currently retired and living in White Rock, British Columbia.
In August 2013, he was again the subject of a language testing event during which he spoke at least 20 languages and modeled the learning process with Korean and Tagalog.

See also
 List of polyglots

References

External links

Articles
 On the Light Side Associated Press News Archive. June 3, 1985.
 Gift of Gab Orlando Sentinel. June 4, 1985.
 Multilingual Speaker to Give Area Seminar Daily News, 1998.
 Powell Janulus – A Short Bio powelljanulus.com, 2015.

Research
 Marilyn Atkinson: Powell Janulus Research Notes Study of Accelerated Language Learning. April 17, 2009.
 Marilyn Atkinson: Seven Years of Research into Powell 2014.

Video Interviews
 Velocity – Powell Janulus – 1992 NLP Language Modelling
 Velocity – Accelerated Language Transformation 2013.

Living people
1939 births
People from Vancouver
World record holders
University of British Columbia alumni
Canadian people of Lithuanian descent
Canadian people of Polish descent
Multilingualism